Raško Katić (born 8 December 1980) is a Serbian professional basketball player for  Sloga Batočina of the Second Regional Basketball League of Serbia. He represented the Serbian national basketball team internationally.

Professional career
Katić began his professional basketball career with KK Zastava in Kragujevac, where he played until mid-season 2003–04. In January 2004, he was hired by the Crvena zvezda, where he spent one year.

In January 2005, he signed with Turkish club İTÜ where he was released after appearing in only six games. He then returned to Serbia and played two games with KK Ergonom. Gaming capacity has been fully demonstrated in the uniform of the German team  Walter Tigers Tübingen, where he became a favorite of the local audience. With them, he played four seasons (2005–2009).

In 2010, Katić came to Hemofarm where he played one season. In 2010, he signed with Partizan Belgrade. With them he spent two seasons, and played for the first time in his career in EuroLeague.

In August 2012, Katić returned to Crvena zvezda signing a two-year contract. On 29 September 2014, Katić signed a one-year deal with the Spanish club CAI Zaragoza. On 16 July 2015, Katić signed a one-plus-one year contract with the Belgian club Telenet Oostende. On 10 June 2016, he re-signed with Oostende for one more season. On 6 June 2017, Katić signed for Spirou Charleroi for the 2017–18 season.

In July 2019, Katić announced his retirement from playing career. Despite his announcement, on 1 August he signed for Kragujevački Radnički of the Second Men's League of Serbia.

On 10 October 2020, a 40-year old Katić scored 41 points in a 91–80 win over Napredak JKP.

National team career 

Katić represented the Serbia men's national basketball team at the EuroBasket 2013. Katić was a member of the Serbian national basketball team that won the silver medal at the 2014 FIBA Basketball World Cup.

Career statistics

EuroLeague

|-
| style="text-align:left;"| 2010–11
| style="text-align:left;"| Partizan
| 16 || 9 || 17.0 || .489 || .000 || .742 || 4.2 || .3 || .4 || .3 || 6.9 || 7.1
|-
| style="text-align:left;"| 2011–12
| style="text-align:left;"| Partizan
| 7 || 0 || 10.7 || .591 || .000 || .750 || .9 || .1 || .3 || .3 || 5.4 || 3.9
|-
| style="text-align:left;"| 2013–14
| style="text-align:left;"| Crvena zvezda
| 10 || 1 || 16.7 || .429 || .000 || .647 || 2.7 || .6 || .5 || .2 || 7.6 || 4.6
|- class="sortbottom"
| style="text-align:center;" colspan=2 | Career
| 33 || 10 || 15.6 || .480 || .000 || .704 || 3.0 || .4 || .4 || .2 || 6.8 || 5.6

See also 
 List of Serbia men's national basketball team players

References

External links

 Raško Katić at aba-liga.com
 Raško Katić at acb.com
 Raško Katić at euroleague.net
 Raško Katić at fiba.com
 Raško Katić at tblstat.net

1980 births
Living people
ABA League players
Basketball League of Serbia players
Basket Zaragoza players
BC Oostende players
Centers (basketball)
İstanbul Teknik Üniversitesi B.K. players
KK Crvena zvezda players
KK Ergonom players
KK Hemofarm players
KK Partizan players
KK Zastava players
KKK Radnički players
Liga ACB players
Serbia men's national basketball team players
Serbian expatriate basketball people in Belgium
Serbian expatriate basketball people in Germany
Serbian expatriate basketball people in Spain
Serbian expatriate basketball people in Turkey
Serbian men's basketball players
Spirou Charleroi players
Sportspeople from Kragujevac
Tigers Tübingen players
2014 FIBA Basketball World Cup players